Água Boa may refer to:

Água Boa, Mato Grosso
 Água Boa Airport
Água Boa, Minas Gerais

See also
 Água Boa do Univini River